Alamabad in Lorestan may refer to:

Alamabad, Dorud
Alamabad, Selseleh
Alamabad-e Sofla